The 1949–50 SM-sarja season was the 19th season of the SM-sarja, the top level of ice hockey in Finland. Eight teams participated in the league, and Ilves Tampere won the championship.

Regular season

External links
 Season on hockeyarchives.info

Fin
Liiga seasons
1949–50 in Finnish ice hockey